Sodium- and chloride-dependent neutral and basic amino acid transporter B(0+) (SLC6A14) is a protein that in humans is encoded by the SLC6A14 gene.

Function 

SLC6A14 is a member of the Na+- and Cl−-dependent neurotransmitter transporter family and transports both neutral and cationic amino acids in an Na+- and Cl−-dependent manner.[supplied by OMIM]

References

Further reading 

 
 
 
 
 

Solute carrier family